Gordon Simpson may refer to:

 Gordon Simpson (Australian politician) (1929–2017), Australian politician
 Gordon Simpson (judge) (1894–1987), Justice of the Supreme Court of Texas
 Gordon Simpson (rugby union) (born 1971), New Zealand-born rugby player
 Gord Simpson (1928–2019), a Canadian ice hockey defenceman